Renacer is the twelfth studio album by Argentine singer Pablo Ruiz. It was released in 2010, coinciding with the celebration of the 25th anniversary of his career.

Track listing 

 Ábreme Tu Ventana
 Después De Ti
 Quiero Verte
 Lo Juro
 Nostalgia
 Yo Te Amo
 Eres Tú
 Mi Chica Ideal (New version)
 Déjame Entrar En Tu Alma
 Te Llevaré
 No Te Escaparás
 Oh Mamá, Ella Me Ha Besado (New version)

References 

Pablo Ruiz (singer) albums
2010 albums